The Stars Are Indifferent to Astronomy is the seventh album by alternative rock band Nada Surf. The album was released by Barsuk Records on January 18, 2012 in Japan, January 23, 2012 in Europe, and January 24, 2012 in the United States. It is their first album of original material since 2008's Lucky.

Track listing
All tracks written by Matthew Caws, Daniel Lorca and Ira Elliot.
 "Clear Eye Clouded Mind" – 3:40
 "Waiting for Something" – 3:35
 "When I Was Young" – 5:18
 "Jules and Jim" – 4:24
 "The Moon Is Calling" – 3:08
 "Teenage Dreams" – 3:47
 "Looking Through" – 4:00
 "Let the Fight Do the Fighting" – 3:17
 "No Snow on the Mountain" – 4:04
 "The Future" – 3:02

Deluxe edition bonus CD
 "The Future" (Acoustic) – 2:57
 "Looking Through" (Acoustic) – 3:43
 "When I Was Young" (Acoustic) – 4:44
 "Waiting for Something" (Acoustic) – 3:37
 "Clear Eye Clouded Mind" (Acoustic) – 3:48

Personnel
Nada Surf
Matthew Caws 
Daniel Lorca 
Ira Elliot 

Additional musicians
Doug Gillard – lead guitar
Joe McGinty – keyboards
Martin Wenk – trumpet, keyboards, xylophone
Phillip Peterson – cello
Louie Lino – keyboards
Chris Shaw – guitar, keyboard

Production
Chris Shaw – production
Nada Surf – production
Chris Shaw – mixing (at Sparky Space)
Greg Calbi – mastering (for Sterling Sound NYC)
Steve Fallone – mastering assistance (for Sterling Sound NYC)
Tom Beaujour – engineering

References

Nada Surf albums
2012 albums